The O'Neill dynasty is a lineage of Irish Gaelic origin.

O'Neill, Ó Néill, O'Neil, O'Neal, or Uí Néill may also refer to:

People

Surnames
Uí Néill, for information on the Ui Neill dynasty
O'Neill (surname), including surname origins and information
List of people with the surname O'Neill, including O'Neal, O'Neil, and other variations
The O'Neill Brothers, an American instrumental duo

Noble titles
Baron O'Neill, a title in the Peerage of the United Kingdom
O'Neill baronets, two in the Baronetage of Ireland, and one in the Baronetage of the United Kingdom
Viscount O'Neill, a title in the Peerage of Ireland

Places

Australia
O'Neill's Adventureland, an amusement park in Edmondson Park, New South Wales

Canada
Archbishop M.C. O'Neill High School, Regina, Saskatchewan
O'Neill Collegiate and Vocational Institute, Oshawa, Ontario

United States
 O'Neal Island, San Juan Islands of Washington
Buckey O'Neill Cabin, a cabin
Eugene O'Neill National Historic Site, Danville, California
Eugene O'Neill Theater Center, a not-for-profit theater company in Connecticut
Eugene O'Neill Theatre, a Broadway theatre
O'Neill, Nebraska, a city
O'Neill Building, a landmarked former department store in New York City
O'Neill Center, an athletic complex at Western Connecticut State University
O'Neill Dam, San Luis Creek west of Los Banos, California
O'Neill House Office Building, Washington, D.C.
O'Neill House Office Building (1947), Washington, D.C.; demolished in 2002
O'Neill Forebay, San Luis Reservoir west of Los Banos, California
O'Neill Tunnel, Boston, Massachusetts
Thomas P. O'Neill Jr. Federal Building (Boston), Massachusetts

Fiction
 The O'Neill, a 1912 American silent film
 April O'Neil, a character in the Teenage Mutant Ninja Turtles franchise
 Danny O'Neil a character from the 1988 movie 14 Going on 30
 Jack O'Neill, a character in the 1989 American action comedy movie Speed Zone
 Jack O'Neill, a character in the Stargate franchise
 Tim O'Neill, a character in the television series seaQuest DSV
 The Trials of Rosie O'Neill, a 1990s American television series

Companies and organizations
O'Neill (brand), a surfwear and equipment brand that was started in San Francisco, California
O'Neill Sea Odyssey, a non-profit organization in Santa Cruz, California
O'Neills, an Irish sportswear company
Sandler O'Neill and Partners, a New York City-based investment banking firm
O'Neal Steel, Inc., an American metal company

Law
Dennis O'Neill case, a Welsh child abuse and manslaughter case
O'Neill v Phillips, a UK company law case on an action for unfair prejudice
Sheff v. O'Neill, a Connecticut Supreme Court case regarding civil rights and the right to education

Other
Eugene O'Neill Award, a Swedish award for stage actors
O'Neill World Cup of Surfing, an annual event at Sunset Beach in Hawaii
O'Neill Sebastian Inlet Pro, a surfing event in Florida
Tip O'Neill Award, an award given out by the Canadian Baseball Hall of Fame
O'Neill ministry, in the Parliament of Northern Ireland 1963–1969
O'Neill cylinder, a proposed style of space habitat
USS O'Neill (DE-188), a Cannon-class destroyer escort in the United States Navy

See also 
 
 
Justice O'Neill (disambiguation)